Matthew Francis Szczur (born July 20, 1989) is an American former professional baseball outfielder. He made his Major League Baseball (MLB) debut with the Chicago Cubs in 2014 and also played for the San Diego Padres. Prior to his pro baseball career, Szczur played football and baseball at Villanova University, winning MVP of the 2009 FCS National Championship Game.

Early life
Szczur was born in Cape May Court House, New Jersey, and grew up in the Erma section of Lower Township, New Jersey. He attended Lower Cape May Regional High School, where he earned varsity letters in football, baseball, and track and field. Szczur was drafted in the 2007 Major League Baseball draft out of high school by the Los Angeles Dodgers in the 38th round, but decided to attend Villanova University instead.

College career
Szczur played both football and baseball for the Villanova Wildcats.

Football
In football, Szczur played wide receiver, running back, wildcat quarterback and was a return specialist on special teams. During his junior season, he Szczur was a consensus All-American and was named the CAA Offensive Player of the Year as Villanova went on to win its first-ever FCS National Championship. In the 2009 NCAA Division I Football Championship Game, he gained 270 all-purpose yards and was awarded MVP honors.

Baseball
In baseball, Szczur served as an outfielder and catcher for the Wildcats. After sitting out his freshman year due to a football-related injury, he hit .392 (142-362) with 62 RBI and 28 stolen bases over the next two seasons. During his junior season, he was a First Team All-Big East selection and named the Philadelphia Big 5 player of the year for baseball.

Professional baseball career

Minor Leagues
Szczur signed a contract with the Chicago Cubs organization, who drafted him in the fifth-round of the 2010 Major League Baseball Draft. He received a $100,000 signing bonus, with an additional $500,000 if he declined to attend the NFL combine and made a written commitment to baseball before February 10, 2011. He was assigned to the club's short season Class-A team, the Boise Hawks, and first appeared in uniform July 8, 2010. He was then promoted to the club's mid-A team, the Peoria Chiefs on July 27, 2010. He hit .347 in 25 games in 2010.

After the 2010 season, Szczur committed to baseball and signed a $1.5 million deal with the Cubs in January 2011. As he was released from his initial contract and signed a new contract to receive the bonus, he would have been eligible in the 2011 Rule 5 draft if not added to the Cubs' 40 man roster.

On July 9, 2011, Szczur was assigned to the High-A Daytona Cubs' roster. He finished the year batting .293 in 109 games between Peoria and Daytona. On July 27, 2012, he was promoted to the Double-A Tennessee Smokies. He slashed .267/.360/.390 in 113 games between Tennessee and Daytona in 2012. In 2013, Szczur returned to Tennessee where he hit .281/.350/.367 with 3 home runs and 44 RBI. He began the 2014 season with the Triple-A Iowa Cubs before being promoted to the Major League roster.

Chicago Cubs
On August 16, 2014, Szczur was called up to the Cubs. He made his debut with the Cubs the next day. Szczur recorded his first Major League hit on August 21 against Madison Bumgarner of the San Francisco Giants. He recorded his first career home run on September 13 against Justin Wilson of the Pittsburgh Pirates

Szczur split time during the 2015 season between Triple-A and the Majors, ultimately being called up by the Cubs on seven occasions. He finished the year hitting .222/.278/.333 in 47 major league games.

On April 29, 2016, he hit his first career Major League grand slam against Chris Withrow of the Atlanta Braves in the 8th inning, putting the Cubs up 6–1. In 2016, Szczur played in 107 games batting .259 with five home runs and 24 RBI. Szczur made no appearances during the Cubs World Series run nor was he on the World Series roster, but still earned his first career championship. Szczur was designated for assignment by the Cubs after only playing in 15 games on May 6, 2017.

San Diego Padres
The Cubs traded Szczur to the San Diego Padres for Justin Hancock on May 8, 2017. Szczur played in 104 games for San Diego in 2017, batting .227/.358/.364 with 3 home runs and 15 RBI. In 2018 with San Diego, Szczur hit .187 in 57 games. On July 1, 2018, he was designated for assignment by San Diego and sent outright to the Triple-A El Paso Chihuahuas.  He declared free agency on October 2, 2018.

Arizona Diamondbacks
On December 14, 2018, Szczur signed a minor league contract with the Arizona Diamondbacks organization. Szczur spent the year with the Triple-A Reno Aces, also playing in 3 games for the AZL Diamondbacks, slashing .313/.380/.569 with 8 home runs and 29 RBI. He elected free agency on November 7, 2019.

Philadelphia Phillies
Szczur signed a minor league contract with the Philadelphia Phillies on December 13, 2019, with an invite to major-league spring training camp. Szczur did not play in a game in 2020 due to the cancellation of the minor league season because of the COVID-19 pandemic. Szczur was released by the Phillies organization on June 28, 2020.

St. Louis Cardinals
On February 13, 2021, Szczur signed a minor league contract with the St. Louis Cardinals organization that included an invitation to Spring Training. In 30 games with the Triple-A Memphis Redbirds, Szczur hit only .186/.236/.382 with 5 home runs and 11 RBI. Szczur was released by the Cardinals organization on June 28, 2021. 

On March 7, 2022, Szczur announced his retirement from professional baseball.

Personal
In 2009, Szczur donated bone marrow to a 15-month-old Ukrainian girl named Anastasia battling leukemia. Szczur essentially saved the girl's life given the severity of her condition and how hard it would have been to find another person that was a match for bone marrow. He met the healthy 4-year-old girl and her parents via Skype using a translator who was present at Anastasia's house. It was documented in E:60 Risking it All, which is one of ESPN's E:60 presentations.

Szczur and his wife, Natalie, were married in November 2014 in Philadelphia, Pennsylvania. They have one child, a son.

References

External links

1989 births
Living people
People from Lower Township, New Jersey
People from Middle Township, New Jersey
Sportspeople from Cape May County, New Jersey
Baseball players from New Jersey
Players of American football from New Jersey
American people of Polish descent
American football wide receivers
Chicago Cubs players
San Diego Padres players
Villanova Wildcats baseball players
Villanova Wildcats football players
Boise Hawks players
Daytona Cubs players
Peoria Chiefs players
Tennessee Smokies players
Iowa Cubs players
El Paso Chihuahuas players
Reno Aces players
Mesa Solar Sox players